Bert Adams was a baseball player.

Bert Adams may also refer to:

Bert Adams, character in Always Greener
Bert Adams (Canadian football), see 1934 in Canadian football
Bert Adams (politician) (1916–2003), member of the Louisiana House of Representatives from 1956 to 1968
Camp Bert Adams

See also
Albert Adams (disambiguation)
Robert Adams (disambiguation)
Hubert Adams, boxer, opponent of David Jaco
Herbert Adams (disambiguation)